The Duke is the fourth studio album by Jørn Lande's solo project Jorn.

The album features Jørn Lande's collaboration with two guitarists Jørn Viggo Lofstad and Tore Moren for the first time together. The two had worked with Jorn before, although separately. While Moren played on Worldchanger, Lofstad played on Out to Every Nation. The album also features former TNT and Vagabond bassist Morty Black, and former The Snakes drummer Willy Bendiksen.

Track Listing

Personnel
Jørn Lande - lead vocals
Jørn Viggo Lofstad - guitar
Tore Moren - guitar
Morty Black - bass
Willy Bendiksen - drums

References

2006 albums
AFM Records albums